The Journal of Moral Philosophy is a peer-reviewed journal of moral, political, and legal philosophy with an international focus. It publishes articles in all areas of normative philosophy, including pure and applied ethics, as well as moral, legal, and political theory. Articles exploring non-Western traditions are also welcome.

The Journal seeks to promote lively discussions and debates for established academics and the wider community, by publishing articles that avoid unnecessary jargon without sacrificing academic rigour. It encourages contributions from newer members of the philosophical community. One issue per year is normally devoted to a particular theme and each issue will contain articles, discussion pieces, review essays, and book reviews. The founding editor was Thom Brooks (2003–2012).

According to the Journal Citation Reports, the journal has a 2015 impact factor of 0.379, ranking it 42nd out of 51 journals in the category "Ethics".

See also 
 List of ethics journals
 List of philosophy journals
 List of political science journals

References

External links
 Journal of Moral Philosophy Web Site

Ethics journals
Brill Publishers academic journals
Political philosophy journals